U-29 may refer to one of the following German submarines:

 During the First World War, Germany also had these submarines with similar names:
 , a Type UB II submarine launched in 1916 and sunk on 13 December 1916
 , a Type UC II submarine launched in 1916 and sunk on 7 June 1917
 , a Type VIIA submarine that served in the Second World War until scuttled on 4 May 1945
 , a Type 206 submarine of the Bundesmarine that was launched in 1974 and decommissioned in 2004

U-29 or U-XXIX may also refer to:
 , a  submarine of the Austro-Hungarian Navy

Submarines of Germany